Gouaux-de-Larboust is a commune in the Haute-Garonne department in southwestern France.

Population

Sport
The ski resort of Peyragudes is high in the Pyrenees in the commune.

See also
Communes of the Haute-Garonne department

References

Communes of Haute-Garonne